Jamie Cureton (born 28 August 1975) is an English former professional footballer. A striker, he is currently player-manager at Enfield.

He began his career at Norwich City in 1994, and after the club's relegation from the Premier League at the end of the season, has spent the majority of his career in England's lower leagues, apart from a season at South Korean side Busan I'Cons in 2003. One of only 29 footballers in the world to have made over 1,000 competitive appearances, his career has spanned nine tiers of the football pyramid from the Premier League to the Essex Senior League, and has seen him score over 350 goals.

He has played professionally in the Football League for AFC Bournemouth, Bristol Rovers, Reading, Queens Park Rangers, Swindon Town, Colchester United, Barnsley, Shrewsbury Town, Exeter City, Leyton Orient and Cheltenham Town, as well as in non-league for Dagenham & Redbridge, Farnborough, Eastleigh, St Albans City, Bishop's Stortford and Hornchurch. He represented England at under-18 level.

Playing career

Early years
Born in Bristol, Cureton began his professional career with Norwich City, before moving on to Bristol Rovers. In 1993, he turned down an offer from Manchester United to stay at Carrow Road. An England youth international, he achieved significant status with the Norwich fans when he dyed his hair yellow and green for an Old Farm derby game against Ipswich Town in 1996 and subsequently scoring in the same fixture. He was sold by Mike Walker to Bristol Rovers in 1996.

Bristol Rovers
Cureton enjoyed a prolific spell at his hometown club. This was particularly the case during the 1999–2000 season where he struck up a partnership with Jason Roberts that almost took the club to promotion. After the club dipped out of the play-off places on the final day of the season he decided his future lay with pastures new, and headed to Reading.

Reading
Cureton moved to Reading in 2000, playing there for three years. While at the club, the Reading supporters' trust had a newly discovered star in the "Perseus" constellation named after him. Here he struck a formidable partnership with Martin Butler, becoming one of the most feared combinations in the Football League. In his first season (2000–01), he scored 30 goals, including a goal in the play-off final against Walsall, a game which Reading went on to lose 3–2. The following season however, it was Cureton who scored the goal to get Reading promoted. He scored the equaliser against Brentford in the closing stages, with a deft flick to help it over the keeper, into the corner of the net.

Busan I'Cons
Cureton then made a mid-2003 switch to K League side Busan I'Cons (now Busan IPark), playing under former Chelsea manager Ian Porterfield. He failed to settle in East Asia however, describing the move as "another big mistake" in 2014. Cureton's time playing in South Korea is documented in the book, Who Ate All the Squid?: Football Adventures in South Korea.

Return to England

After being released from his contract at Busan, he returned to England and joined Queens Park Rangers on 30 January 2004. One of the more memorable of the six goals he scored there was a volley from a tight angle against Coventry City which echoed Marco Van Basten's goal against USSR in the Euro 1988 final. After a mostly unsettled season at Loftus Road though, he joined Swindon Town in June 2005.

He failed to make his mark in his first spell at the club and subsequently joined Colchester United on loan. He then briefly returned to Swindon Town as they failed to avoid relegation to League Two. After Swindon's relegation, Cureton activated a clause in his contract that allowed him to leave Swindon on a free transfer, and rejoined Colchester on a permanent basis. His first full season with the U's proved to be hugely successful as the Essex club managed a 10th-place finish in the Championship, partnering Chris Iwelumo.

One of Cureton's main highlights in a Colchester shirt was the hat-trick he scored in the 3–0 away win against Essex rivals Southend United on 7 April 2007.

His 23 goals in the 2006–07 season gave him the Championship Golden Boot as the league's top scorer, and made him the first Colchester United striker since Tony Adcock to score 20 league goals in a season; the first for 22 years.

On 5 June 2007, due to agent demands, Cureton handed in a transfer request to Colchester United, citing Colchester's ambitions differing from his own. This inevitably fuelled speculation that Cureton might return to Norwich City, the club where he began his career. Cureton himself stated that he would like to return to the club.

Colchester initially rejected the transfer request, saying that Cureton was an important part of the club's future and that they wanted to keep him, though Norwich City manager Peter Grant confirmed that he would like to sign Cureton. Cureton moved to Norwich City for £825,000 on 29 June 2007. He was signed as a replacement for Robert Earnshaw, Norwich's top scorer of the 2006–07 season, who left for Derby County in a £3.5 million deal the same day.

Norwich City
After his success at Colchester United, Cureton had a disappointing return to Norwich City.

He scored his first goals for Norwich since re-signing against King's Lynn at The Walks. This was followed up by another goal on Norwich's pre season tour of Holland against AGOVV Apeldoorn.

He then scored two in the League Cup against Barnet and two on his league debut for Norwich against Southampton.

Cureton continued to play very much a bit part during the season and one of his few goals came during the Canaries' 1–0 win at Scunthorpe United, a victory that lifted Norwich clear of the relegation places ahead of the Christmas and New Year fixtures.

Due to lack of first team football, on 27 November 2008, Cureton joined Barnsley on a 3-month loan deal, but on 14 January 2009, he was recalled to Norwich City after Glenn Roeder's termination as manager.

When Norwich played Barnsley on the following weekend, the Canaries were 4–0 victors with Cureton scoring their second. Cureton played his 100th game for Norwich City against Coventry but put in a bad performance and was dropped for the rest of the season.

The following season, newly appointed manager Paul Lambert started Cureton for the first three games, only to drop him to the bench for the next two games, leaving him an unused sub for both.

Cureton scored his first two goals of the season, against Leyton Orient and Bristol Rovers, both in which he came on as a late sub. Cureton scored the winning penalty in a Football League Trophy match against Swindon. However this was to be his last appearance for Norwich as after this he failed to even secure a place on the bench. After being loaned out to Shrewsbury for the remainder of the season Cureton was released by Norwich City.

Cureton joined Shrewsbury Town on loan until the end of the 2009–10 season on 16 February 2010 from Norwich. After a number of starts and a number of unimpressive performances, he was sent back to Norwich prematurely.

Exeter City and Leyton Orient
Cureton spent the 2010 pre-season on trial with Exeter City, stating he would like to link up with a club closer to his Bristol home, and joined on a short-term deal in August 2010. A contract extension saw him continue with the Grecians until the end of 2010–11, a season in which he finished as the club's top scorer, with 20 goals in all competition,s and won the Supporter's Player of the Year and Player's Player of the Year awards. A deal was offered for Cureton to stay at Exeter for 2011-12 was declined by Cureton, who instead joined Leyton Orient in June 2011. He scored his first and only goal for the O's on 7 January 2012, in a 4–1 loss at Carlisle United, before re-joining Exeter on loan just under two months later. He scored one goal in seven appearances as the Grecians were relegated from League One. Cureton was released by Orient after the expiry of his contract in May 2012, and signed a permanent deal with Exeter in July 2012. He played 42 games in 2012–13, scoring 21 goals, but was released at the end of the season.

Cheltenham Town

On 17 June 2013, it was announced that Cureton had agreed terms on a one-year deal with Cheltenham Town. He ended the season with 11 goals in 36 appearances which included 12 substitute appearances. He was released by the club on 7 May 2014.

Dagenham & Redbridge
On 24 July 2014, Cureton agreed a one-year deal with League Two side Dagenham & Redbridge, the 14th club of his senior career. Following the retirements of Ryan Giggs and Kevin Phillips and Ian Goodison's departure from Tranmere Rovers, 39-year-old Cureton was the oldest onfield player in all four of England's top divisions. He was awarded player of the Year 2014–15 at the Daggers on the last home game of the season.

Later career
Cureton signed a short-term contract with Farnborough in August 2016, before moving to Eastleigh of the National League the following month. In early December, he departed Eastleigh after a change of management, and briefly re-joined Farnborough, scoring in his first game since returning to the club in a 2–3 home defeat against Hanwell Town, before joining St Albans City that same month. He returned to Farnborough  in April 2017 on dual registration for the remainder of the 2016–17 season, and in July a permanent deal of one year was agreed. Having scored ten goals in 23 league appearances for Farnborough, Cureton joined Bishop's Stortford midway through the 2017–18 season, making his début in a 0–3 defeat to Royston Town on 1 January 2018. In April 2019, Cureton reached the landmark of 1,000 senior club appearances, scoring twice as Bishop's Stortford beat Brightlingsea Regent 3–2. In 2019 he signed dual registration terms with Enfield, who groundshare with Bishop's Stortford. After being sent off eight minutes into his debut on 8 October, he scored in his second appearance on 24 October, becoming the first player to score in the top nine levels of English football. In February 2020, Cureton signed for Isthmian Premier League side Hornchurch. In June 2020, following a brief spell at the club in the 2019–20 season, Cureton signed for Enfield.

Coaching career
Cureton was appointed as an assistant coach at Arsenal's academy in September 2017.

Following the resignation of Adam Flint in September 2018, Cureton became manager of Bishop's Stortford alongside club owner Steve Smith, as an interim to begin with. They guided Stortford to a seventh-place finish in the Isthmian Premier that season. In October 2019 he took sole charge of the position.

In September 2020, he was appointed manager while still an active player at Enfield, becoming player-manager.

Career statistics

Honours
Reading
Football League Second Division runner-up: 2001–02

Queens Park Rangers
Football League Second Division runner-up: 2003–04

Individual
Football League Championship Golden Boot: 2006–07
PFA Team of the Year: 2012–13 League Two

References

External links

England profile at theFA

1975 births
Living people
Footballers from Bristol
English footballers
English expatriate footballers
England youth international footballers
Association football forwards
Norwich City F.C. players
AFC Bournemouth players
Bristol Rovers F.C. players
Reading F.C. players
Busan IPark players
Queens Park Rangers F.C. players
Swindon Town F.C. players
Colchester United F.C. players
Barnsley F.C. players
Shrewsbury Town F.C. players
Exeter City F.C. players
Leyton Orient F.C. players
Cheltenham Town F.C. players
Dagenham & Redbridge F.C. players
Farnborough F.C. players
Eastleigh F.C. players
Bishop's Stortford F.C. players
Bishop's Stortford F.C. managers
St Albans City F.C. players
Enfield F.C. players
Hornchurch F.C. players
Arsenal F.C. non-playing staff
Enfield F.C. managers
Premier League players
English Football League players
K League 1 players
National League (English football) players
Southern Football League players
Isthmian League players
Essex Senior Football League players
English expatriate sportspeople in South Korea
Expatriate footballers in South Korea
English football managers
Association football coaches